John Garton may refer to:
John Garton (bishop), British Anglican bishop and theologian
John Garton (MP), English member of Parliament for Dover
John Garton (1863–1922), plant breeder and founder of Gartons Limited